Three referendums were held in Switzerland in 1882. Two were held on 30 July on copyright law and measures against epidemics, both of which were rejected. The third was held on 26 November on executing article 27 of the federal constitution, and was rejected by 64.9% of voters.

Background
The referendums on epidemics and the constitution were optional referendums, which meant that only a majority of the public vote was required for the proposals to be approved. The referendum on copyright law was a mandatory referendum, which required both a majority of voters and cantons to approve the proposals.

Results

Copyright law

Measures against epidemics

Execution of article 27 of the federal constitution

References

1882 referendums
1882 in Switzerland
Referendums in Switzerland